Patricia Mok (born 17 October 1971) is a Chinese Singaporean actress, best known for humorous roles on Comedy Night during her stint as a JTEAM artist until 2012. She was prominently a full-time Mediacorp artiste from 1996 to 2012.

Early life 
Mok was educated in Ping Yi Secondary School and Yishun Junior College.

Career
Mok made her debut in the 1990s comedy show Comedy Nite. She was a cast member from 1996, until the demise of the show. Her roles in the skits helped her to land a contract with MediaCorp in 2006.

She won the Best Supporting Actress Award in the Star Awards 2003 for playing a dowdy and meek wife in Holland V, and earned two nominations in the Asian Television Awards in 2006 and 2008.

Mok was switched to hosting MediaCorp events and shows in 2010. In a 2012 interview, she confessed that she felt uncomfortable being an emcee and thought she was better suited to acting in dramas and sitcoms.

Mok left the entertainment industry in early 2012 after her contract expired and is currently under the management of Fly Artistes.  In 2016, she appeared in the Singaporean-Malaysian comedy film Let's Eat!.

Personal life
In June 2009, Mok was molested while she was partying at Zirca, Clarke Quay. A drunk 30-year-old man, Yeoh Chuen How, had pinched her buttocks, following which Mok confronted him immediately and called the police. Mok and Yeoh settled out of court and Yeoh paid S$10,000 to Mok as compensation. Mok donated the entire sum to charity.

Filmography

TV series

Variety show

Film

Accolades

References

External links
Patricia's profile on Mediacorp

Singaporean people of Chinese descent
Singaporean people of Teochew descent
Singaporean film actresses
Singaporean television actresses
Living people
1971 births
20th-century Singaporean actresses
21st-century Singaporean actresses